A list of films produced by the Ollywood film industry based in Bhubaneswar in the 1940s:

References

1940s
Ollywood
Films, Ollywood